Wangcun is a town under the administration of Xingyang City in  northwest-central Henan province, China, located about  northwest of downtown Xingyang. , it has 24 villages under its administration.

Economy 
Located on the flat southern bank of the Yellow River, Wangcun is known for its aquaculture. Since their development started in 1986, the pond systems in Wangcun have grown to the total size of 15,000 mu (10 km2), making the town the largest aquaculture center in North China.

In 2007, construction started in Wangcun on a large turtle farm raising the Yellow River Turtle (a local variety of the Chinese softshell turtle). With the capacity for raising 5 million turtles a year, the facility was expected to become Henan's largest farm of this kind.

See also 
 List of township-level divisions of Henan

References 

Township-level divisions of Henan
Zhengzhou